"Dancing Machine" is a song recorded by American R&B group the Jackson 5, and was the title track of their ninth studio album. The song was originally recorded for the group's 1973 album G.I.T.: Get It Together and was released as a remix for a response to the success of the single.

Background
The song, which reportedly sold over three million copies, popularized the physically complicated robot dance technique, devised by Charles Washington in the late 1960s. Michael Jackson first performed the dance on television while singing "Dancing Machine" with the Jackson 5 on an episode of Soul Train on November 3, 1973.  It was the group's first US top ten hit since 1971's "Sugar Daddy".  "Dancing Machine" brought the Jackson 5 their second Grammy Award nomination in 1975 for Best R&B Performance by a Duo or Group with Vocals, losing to Rufus and Chaka Khan's "Tell Me Something Good".

Personnel
Lead vocals by Michael Jackson and Jermaine Jackson
Background vocals by Michael Jackson, Jermaine Jackson, Tito Jackson, Jackie Jackson and Marlon Jackson
Instrumentation by Los Angeles area session musicians:
Bass by William Salter
Guitars by Dean Parks, David T. Walker and Arthur Wright
Drums by James Gadson
Percussion by Bobbye Hall
Keyboards by Joe Sample
Produced by Hal Davis
Arranged by Arthur Wright

Charts
In Canada, "Dancing Machine" went to No. 2 on the RPM 100. In the United States, it hit No. 1 on Cash Box and reached No. 2 on the Billboard Hot 100, behind "The Streak" by Ray Stevens. In addition, it hit No. 1 on the R&B charts. Billboard ranked it as the No. 5 song for 1974.

All-time charts

Samples and cover versions
"Dancing Machine" was most notably sampled by MC Hammer, on his 1990 album Please Hammer Don't Hurt 'Em, for "Dancin' Machine". It was also sampled again in 1990 by Vanilla Ice on the album To the Extreme, later by Too $hort (featuring Bun B) on the song "Shout It Out" and by Q-tip on the 2008 album The Renaissance for "Move". Yung Wun sampled it for "Tear It Up" on his album The Dirtiest Thirstiest, in which the sample was uncredited and is taken directly from the film Drumline, when the marching band performed it in medley.

Additionally, the song was covered by Roni Griffith in 1984. Another alternate remix version was released on The Original Soul of Michael Jackson in 1987. It was remixed with extra vocals and many overdubbed instruments, giving it an 80's pop feel rather than a mid 70's disco feel. Paula Abdul covered the song in 1997 as an unreleased demo. It was also covered by Suburban Legends on their Japan-only EP, Dance Like Nobody's Watching: Tokyo Nights. A longer alternate version (4:25) appears on the I Want You Back! Unreleased Masters compilation released in 2009. A remix by Polow da Don was featured in a commercial for Svedka. This version was later released on the 2009 album The Remix Suite. In D-TV, it was set to the Dance of the Hours segment from Fantasia. Justin Timberlake interpolated part of the song (watch her get down, watch her get down) for his 2013 album The 20/20 Experience – 2 of 2 for "Murder". The song was reworked and covered by English singer Laura Mvula in 2017, with the song produced by Naughty Boy.

References

1973 songs
1974 singles
The Jackson 5 songs
Cashbox number-one singles
Songs written by Hal Davis
Song recordings produced by Hal Davis
Songs written by Dean Parks
Motown singles